Público may refer to:

  (Portugal), a Portuguese newspaper
  (Spain), a Spanish newspaper launched in September 2007
 a system of land transport in Puerto Rico system, similar to share taxis

ca:Público